Many trees in the Union Territory of Chandigarh are given a privileged part of the natural heritage of the city which serves as an important green landmark, so the Chandigarh government came up with a list of 31 trees which are called Heritage Trees of Chandigarh. One can contact the Department of Forest & Wildlife administration or Chandigarh Tree Lovers to get a copy of the booklet which they made and published with all the details. 

Those trees which are 100 years old were identified and put in a list of "heritage status". Out of 31, the Chandigarh government identified that 15 of them are peepal, 11 are banyan, 4 are mango trees, and only one is an earpod tree. The oldest tree which was found standing from the last 350 years is one of the peepal trees in Khudda Ali Sher village.

References 

Chandigarh
Trees of India